Puerto Rico Senatorial District III, also known as the Senatorial District of Arecibo, is one of the eight senatorial districts of Puerto Rico. It is currently represented by José Pérez Rosa and Angel Martínez (both from the New Progressive Party).

District profile

The Senatorial District III has an approximate population of 470,250. It covers the following municipalities:
 Arecibo
 Barceloneta
 Camuy
 Ciales
 Dorado
 Florida
 Hatillo
 Manatí
 Quebradillas
 Vega Alta
 Vega Baja

In previous distributions, the territory covered by the Senatorial District III has changed. In 1983, the District included the municipalities of Isabela and Morovis. In the 1991 redistribution, Isabela was assigned to the District of Mayagüez and Morovis to the District of Guayama. Meanwhile Toa Alta was assigned to Arecibo.

In the 2002 redistribution, Morovis was reassigned to the district while Toa Alta was reassigned to the District of Bayamón.

Election results

2012

|-
! style="background-color:#0080FF" |
| style="width: 130px" | New Progressive Party (PNP)
|               | Angel "Chayanne" Martínez
| 117,857
| 24.68
| -1.53
|-
! style="background-color:#0080FF" |
| style="width: 130px" | New Progressive Party (PNP)
|               | José "Joito" Pérez
| 117,297
| 24.56
| 
|-
! style="background-color:#FF0000" |
| style="width: 130px" | Popular Democratic Party (PPD)
|               | Wanda Arroyo
| 114,871
| 24.06
| 
|-
! style="background-color:#FF0000" |
| style="width: 130px" | Popular Democratic Party (PPD)
|               | Rubén Soto
| 112,674
| 23.60
| 
|-
! style="background-color:#01DF3A" |
| style="width: 130px" | Puerto Rican Independence Party (PIP)
|               | Jaime Bonel González
| 5,314
| 1.11
| +0.23
|-
! style="background-color:#01DF3A" |
| style="width: 130px" | Puerto Rican Independence Party (PIP)
|               | Luis Cruz
| 5,142
| 1.08
| 
|-
! style="background-color:#008080" |
| style="width: 130px" | Movimiento Unión Soberanista (MUS)
|               | Rafael Capella Angueira
| 1,735
| 0.36
|

2008

|-
! style="background-color:#0080FF" |
| style="width: 130px" | New Progressive Party (PNP)
|               | Angel "Chayanne" Martínez
| 129,333
| 26.21%
| 
|-
! style="background-color:#0080FF" |
| style="width: 130px" | New Progressive Party (PNP)
|               | José Emilio González
| 128,799
| 26.10
| 
|-
! style="background-color:#FF0000" |
| style="width: 130px" | Popular Democratic Party (PPD)
|               | María Elena Pérez
| 107,805
| 21.84
| 
|-
! style="background-color:#FF0000" |
| style="width: 130px" | Popular Democratic Party (PPD)
|               | Américo Martínez
| 106,009
| 21.48
| 
|-
! style="background-color:#FFBF00" |
| style="width: 130px" | Puerto Ricans for Puerto Rico Party (PPR)
|               | José Radamés Fuentes
| 5,135
| 1.04
| 
|-
! style="background-color:#FFBF00" |
| style="width: 130px" | Puerto Ricans for Puerto Rico Party (PPR)
|               | Antonio Fernández Santiago
| 5,034
| 1.02
| 
|-
! style="background-color:#01DF3A" |
| style="width: 130px" | Puerto Rican Independence Party (PIP)
|               | Rubén Marín Miranda
| 4,380
| 0.89
| 
|-
! style="background-color:#01DF3A" |
| style="width: 130px" | Puerto Rican Independence Party (PIP)
|               | Jaime Bonel González
| 4,350
| 0.88
|

2004

|-
! style="background-color:#0080FF" |
| style="width: 130px" | New Progressive Party (PNP)
|               | José Emilio González
| 123,570
| 24.81%
| 
|-
! style="background-color:#0080FF" |
| style="width: 130px" | New Progressive Party (PNP)
|               | Víctor David Loubriel
| 123,503
| 24.80
| 
|-
! style="background-color:#FF0000" |
| style="width: 130px" | Popular Democratic Party (PPD)
|               | Lucy Molinari
| 116,939
| 23.48
| 
|-
! style="background-color:#FF0000" |
| style="width: 130px" | Popular Democratic Party (PPD)
|               | Rafael Rodríguez Vargas
| 114,861
| 23.06
| 
|-
! style="background-color:#01DF3A" |
| style="width: 130px" | Puerto Rican Independence Party (PIP)
|               | Damaris Mangual Vélez
| 9,074
| 1.82
| 
|-
! style="background-color:#01DF3A" |
| style="width: 130px" | Puerto Rican Independence Party (PIP)
|               | Josué Correa Colón
| 7,824
| 1.57
|

References

External links
Distribución de Distritos Senatoriales de Puerto Rico

Puerto Rico Senatorial districts